The First Decade (1983–1993) is a compilation album from Christian recording artist Michael W. Smith. This album also features two new songs "Do You Dream of Me?" and "Kentucky Rose". A follow-up compilation album, The Second Decade (1993–2003), was released ten years later, picking up where The First Decade left off.

Track listing

Personnel 
Credits for new recordings
 Michael W. Smith – lead vocals, backing vocals (1), acoustic piano (2)
 Mark Hammond – keyboard programming (1), bass and drum programming (1)
 Mark Heimmerman – keyboards (2), backing vocals (2)
 Phil Madeira – Hammond B3 organ (2)
 Jerry Dale McFadden – accordion (2)
 Dann Huff – guitars (1, 2)
 Gary Chapman – pedabro (2), backing vocals (2)
 Jerry McPherson – mandolin (2)
 Tommy Sims – bass (2)
 Steve Brewster – drums (2)
 Terry McMillan – percussion (2), harmonica (2)
 Amy Grant – backing vocals (1)
 Chris Harris – backing vocals (2)

Production 
 Michael Blanton – executive producer 
 Michael W. Smith – executive producer, co-producer (2), producer (3-15)
 Mark Hammond – producer (1)
 Mark Heimmerman – producer (2-5), mixing (2)
 Bryan Lenox – co-producer (6, 7, 10)
 Wayne Kirkpatrick – producer (8, 9)
 John Potoker – producer (11, 12)
 Ronnie Brookshire – engineer (1), mixing (1)
 Todd Robbins – engineer (1)
 Joe Baldridge – engineer (2), mixing (2)
 JB – engineer (2)
 Dave Dillbeck – second engineer (1)
 Amy Hughes – second engineer (2)
 David Hall – mix assistant (2)
 Nick Sparks – technician assistant (1)
 Hank Williams – mastering (1, 2)
 Julee Brand – cover coordinator 
 Elizabeth Simmons – cover coordinator 
 Buddy Jackson – art direction
 D.L. Rhodes – art direction
 Beth Middleworth – design 
 Mark Tucker – photography 
 June Arnold – grooming 

Studios
 Recorded at Deer Valley Studio and Fun Attic Studio (Franklin, Tennessee); Quad Studios (Nashville, Tennessee).
 Mixed at Emerald Sound Studios and Sixteenth Avenue Sound (Nashville, Tennessee).
 Mastered at MasterMix (Nashville, Tennessee).

Chart performance

References

1993 compilation albums
Michael W. Smith compilation albums
Reunion Records albums